The 1990 New Jersey United States Senate election was held on November 6, 1990 to select the Class 2 U.S. Senator from the state of New Jersey.  Democratic U.S. Senator Bill Bradley decided to seek re-election and narrowly edged out little-known Republican Christine Todd Whitman.

Democratic primary

Candidates
 Bill Bradley, incumbent U.S. Senator since 1979
Daniel Z. Seyler, Phillipsburg resident

Results

Republican primary

Candidates
Christine Todd Whitman, President of the New Jersey Board of Public Utilities and former Somerset County Freeholder (1983–1988)

Declined
Leanna Brown, State Senator from Chatham

Campaign
The New Jersey Republican Party struggled to recruit a candidate to oppose Bradley, a widely popular incumbent with financial resources in a state that had not elected a Republican to the Senate since 1972, although incumbent Republican President George H. W. Bush had carried the state by a wide margin in 1988 and remained highly popular. The two most commonly mentioned candidates were Christine Todd Whitman, the president of the state board of public utilities, and State Senator Leanna Brown, who had raised her profile through her involvement in Jim Courter's 1989 gubernatorial campaign. Brown removed herself from consideration on February 24, leaving Whitman as the likely nominee.

Bradley was expected to outspend the Republican nominee four-to-one and even Whitman admitted that the goal of the Republican campaign was not winning, but rather "show[ing] there are good credible candidates... to show there is life after Tom Kean." Whitman, the daughter of former party chair Webster B. Todd, resigned from the public utilities board on March 5 and announced she would face Bradley with the support of the state party on March 13. In doing so, Whitman passed up the opportunity to run for an open U.S. House seat vacated by Jim Courter. Acknowledging the uphill battle Whitman faced, Somerset party chair Jack Penn compared her odds to those of Buster Douglas, a 42:1 underdog who had knocked out Mike Tyson one month earlier.

Results

General election

Candidates
 Bill Bradley, incumbent U.S. Senator since 1979 (Democratic)
 John Kucek (Populist)
 Don Mackle (Socialist Workers)
 Louis Stefanelli (Libertarian)
 Christine Todd Whitman, President of the New Jersey Board of Public Utilities (Republican)

Campaign 
U.S. Senator Bill Bradley didn't realize he was in danger of losing re-election and the New Jersey voters' anger over taxes and economy until the week prior to the election.

In the early part of the campaign, Bradley already had a major image problem; he was comfortably ahead in the polls, so his staffers told him to play it safe. He aired television advertisements of himself walking on the beach, shooting a perfect shot on the court, and sitting back in his office with his basketball shoes on his desk. The advertisements backfired as voters were turned off and thought that he wasn't taking his job seriously, especially at a time when voters were suffering.

Another major problem with Bradley was how Democratic Governor Jim Florio implemented a $2.8 billion tax increase, hurting the state's economy. In addition, Bradley refused to answer questions pertaining to Florio's tax policies.

After Bradley realized he was in trouble, he released negative advertisements attacking Whitman's own record on taxes, accusing her of favoring tax increases when she was a Somerset County Freeholder. Bradley's image may have been further damaged by his newer advertisements.

Polling

Results

Results by County

See also 
 1990 United States Senate elections

References 

New Jersey
1990
United States Senate